is a Japanese football player.

Playing career
Kitamoto was born in Nara on September 18, 1981. After graduating from high school, he joined J1 League club Vissel Kobe in 2000. He debuted in 2001 and became a regular player as center back in 2002. Although Vissel played in J2 League in 2006 season, played in J1 for a long time. He also played many matches as regular player for a long time. However Vissel was relegated to J2 again end of 2012 season. Although the club was promoted to J1 in a year, his opportunity to play decreased from 2013 season. After 19 years at Vissel Kobe, Kitamoto left the club after the 2018 season.

Club statistics

References

External links

1981 births
Living people
Association football people from Nara Prefecture
Japanese footballers
J1 League players
J2 League players
Vissel Kobe players
Association football defenders